Barasano may be
Barasana language
Bará language